Kanjuruhan Stadium (Indonesian: Stadion Kanjuruhan) was a multi-purpose stadium in Malang Regency, East Java, Indonesia. It was used mostly for football matches. The stadium holds 42,449. It was the home ground of Arema, a football team in Liga 1. It was also used by Persekam Metro Kabupaten Malang of the Liga 3. It was named after the Kingdom of Kanjuruhan, an 8th-century Hindu kingdom in present-day Malang area.

In aftermath of the Kanjuruhan Stadium disaster, after meeting with FIFA President Gianni Infantino on 18 October 2022, President Joko Widodo issued orders to deactivate Kanjuruhan Stadium and demolish and rebuild the stadium according to FIFA standard.

History
Kanjuruhan Stadium was built in 1997 with an estimated construction cost at Rp35 billion. On 9 June 2004, the stadium was inaugurated for use by President Megawati Soekarnoputri, marked by a trial match in the middle of the 2004 Indonesian First League Division between Arema and PSS Sleman. The match ended in a 1-0 victory for Arema.

It was also renovated in 2010 for the purposes of the 2011 AFC Champions League in terms of adding lighting power.

Departments and facilities 
Prior to its deactivation, Kanjuruhan Stadium was divided into several departments and facilities as follows:

 Football stadium
 Training field
 Transportation safety educational park
 Press conference and auditorium departmen
 Skating tracks
 Kanjuruhan indoor sport arena and basketball court
 Swimming pool
 Indoor swimming pool
 Outdoor swimming 0ool 
 Wall climbing area
 Healthcare and mini ICU department
 Praying room and religious services department
 Culinary department.

Aside of the departments, Kanjuruhan Stadium complex also housed three offices:

 Office of Youth and Sports of Malang Regency
 Malang Regency branch of the National Sports Committee of Indonesia
 Government Education and Training Agency of Malang Regency

Incident 

On 1 October 2022, at least 135 people were killed in a human crush during a stampede on the stadium. The stadium will be demolished.

Gallery

See also
Arema
Arema Putri
Persekam Metro
List of stadiums in Indonesia

References 

2004 establishments in Indonesia
Sports venues in Indonesia
Football venues in Indonesia
Athletics (track and field) venues in East Java
Multi-purpose stadiums in Indonesia
Football venues in East Java
Buildings and structures in East Java
Sports venues completed in 2004